The 1951 Illinois Fighting Illini football team was an American football team that represented the University of Illinois during the 1951 Big Ten Conference football season.  In their 10th year under head coach Ray Eliot, the Illini compiled a 9–0–1 record, finished in first place in the Big Ten Conference, was ranked #4 in the final AP Poll, and defeated Stanford 40–7 in the 1952 Rose Bowl. The lone setback was a scoreless tie with Ohio State. Illinois defeated Stanford 40 to 7 in the 1952 Rose Bowl, the first nationally televised college football game. The team was named co-national champion by Boand, which split its selection with Georgia Tech.

Al Brosky had an NCAA career record 29 interceptions, including an NCAA record 15-game streak covering the entire 1951 season. He was inducted into the College Football Hall of Fame in 1998.

Halfback Johnny Karras was a consensus first-team pick on the 1951 College Football All-America Team. Linebacker Chuck Boerio was selected as the team's most valuable player.

Schedule

Players
 Chuck Boerio, center (1st-team All-America pick by NEA; 1st-team All-Big Ten pick by AP)
 Al Brosky, halfback (1st-team All-America pick by AP and Football Writers)
 Johnny Karras, halfback (consensus 1st-team All-American; 1st-team All-Big Ten pick by AP and UP)
 Rex Smith, end (1st-team All-Big Ten pick by AP)
 Chuck Studley, tackle (1st-team All-Big Ten pick by AP and UP)
 Chuck Ulrich, tackle (1st-team All-America pick by INS; 1st-team All-Big Ten pick by AP and UP)
 Bill Tate Rose Bowl MVP

Roster

Head Coach: Ray Eliot (10th year at Illinois)

References

Illinois
Illinois Fighting Illini football seasons
Big Ten Conference football champion seasons
Rose Bowl champion seasons
College football undefeated seasons
Illinois Fighting Illini football